Andy Warren is a Canadian independent musician. He currently resides in Vancouver, British Columbia, Canada.

His music has been characterized as genre-crossing "Vancouver folk soul" and "an eclectic, Ben Harperish amalgam of poly rhythms laid over jazz, funk, soul and folk/roots elements".

Discography
2004 Those Three
2006 The Blurring Line (EP)
2006 The Blurring Line (Single)

References

External links
Official website

CBC Radio 3 Featured Artist

Year of birth missing (living people)
Living people
Place of birth missing (living people)
Canadian pop singers
Canadian male singers
Canadian singer-songwriters
Musicians from Vancouver
Canadian male singer-songwriters